The McGrath Cup is a Gaelic football competition played each January in Munster. The competition was introduced for the benefit of the weaker counties, but in the mid-1990s, Kerry and Cork were included. Several college teams previously participated but, from 2016, only county teams compete.

Trophy
Joe McGrath donated the trophy to the Munster Council in 1981 for the promotion of Gaelic football.

List of finals

Roll of honour

References

External links
 Munster GAA page on the McGrath Cup

 
Gaelic football cup competitions
1